Jeyes may refer to:

People 
James Jeyes (1890–?), English footballer
John Jeyes (1817–1892), English chemist

Other uses 
Jeyes Fluid, brand of disinfectant fluid
Jeyes Tournament, Irish golf tournament sponsored by Jeyes Group